Donacaula mucronella is a species of moth of the family Crambidae. It is found in Europe.

The wingspan is 22–26 mm for the male and 29–35 mm for females.The forewings are brown; an ochreous- whitish costal streak, edged below with dark fuscous suffusion. Hindwings fuscous-whitish.

The moth flies from June to September depending on the location.

The larvae feed on Carex, Carex riparia, Glyceria maxima and Phragmites.

References

External links

 waarneming.nl 
 Lepidoptera of Belgium

Schoenobiinae
Moths described in 1775
Moths of Japan
Moths of Europe
Moths of Asia